The 2000 Fresno mayoral election was held on March 8, 2000 and November 7, 2000 to elect the mayor of Fresno, California. It saw the election of Alan Autry.

Incumbent mayor Jim Patterson was term limited.

Results

First round

Runoff results

References 

2000 California elections
Mayoral elections in Fresno, California
Fresno